Kevin Görtz (born 28 November 1989 in Emmen) is a Dutch professional footballer who currently plays as a right back for HHC Hardenberg in the Dutch Tweede Divisie. He formerly played for FC Emmen and WKE.

References

1989 births
Living people
Dutch footballers
FC Emmen players
Eerste Divisie players
Tweede Divisie players
Derde Divisie players
WKE players
Association football fullbacks
Footballers from Emmen, Netherlands